"Calling Out to Carol" is a song by American singer-songwriter Stan Ridgway and is the third and final single released in support of his 1989 album Mosquitos.

Formats and track listing 
All songs written by Stan Ridgway

UK 7" single (EIRS 106)
"Calling Out to Carol" – 4:04
"Can't Stop the Show" (live) – 3:51

UK 12" single (EIRST 106)
"Calling Out to Carol" – 4:04
"Can't Stop the Show" (live) – 3:51
"Drive, She Said" – 4:39

Charts

References

External links 
 

1989 songs
1989 singles
I.R.S. Records singles
Stan Ridgway songs
Songs written by Stan Ridgway